The Third Dreyer cabinet is the current state government of Rhineland-Palatinate, sworn in on 18 May 2021 after Malu Dreyer was elected as Minister-President of Rhineland-Palatinate by the members of the Landtag of Rhineland-Palatinate. It is the 25th Cabinet of Rhineland-Palatinate.

It was formed after the 2021 Rhineland-Palatinate state election by the Social Democratic Party (SPD), Alliance 90/The Greens (GRÜNE), and the Free Democratic Party (FDP). Excluding the Minister-President, the cabinet comprises nine ministers. Five are members of the SPD, two are members of the Greens, and two are members of the FDP.

Formation 

The previous cabinet was a coalition government of the SPD, FDP, and Greens led by Minister-President Malu Dreyer of the SPD.

The election took place on 14 March 2021, and resulted in no net change for the SPD, while the Greens improved from fifth to third place and the FDP saw a slight decline. The opposition CDU and AfD also suffered losses while the Free Voters entered the Landtag for the first time.

Minister-President Dreyer expressed her desire to renew the coalition between the SPD, Greens, and FDP. State FDP chairman Volker Wissing made similar comments. The three parties began exploratory talks on 18 March.

On 30 April, they announced they had agreed to renew the coalition. In early May, all three parties held congresses to approve the coalition agreement. It passed the SPD congress with 96.2% of delegates voting in favour, while 83.3% of the Greens approved, as did 82.9% of the FDP.

The Landtag re-elected Dreyer as Minister-President for a third term on 18 May, receiving 55 votes out of the 51 required for a majority.

Composition

External links 
Council of Ministers - RLP Government

References 

Cabinets of Rhineland-Palatinate
State governments of Germany
Cabinets established in 2021
2021 establishments in Germany